The NSU Sharks Women's Volleyball team represents Nova Southeastern University in Davie, Florida. They currently compete in the Sunshine State Conference.

History

1980s
The women's volleyball team started in 1984 becoming a member of the National Little College Athletic Association (NLCAA). In 1985 joins the National Association of Intercollegiate Athletics (NAIA), becoming from 1985–89 District 25 Championship.

1990s
In 1990, NSU joins with seven other NAIA schools (Flagler College, Webber College, St. Thomas University, Embry-Riddle Aeronautical University, Palm Beach Atlantic College, Warner Southern College and Florida Memorial College) to form the Florida Intercollegiate Athletic Conference (FIAC). In 1992, The Florida Intercollegiate Athletic Conference is changed to the Florida Sun Conference (FSC) and Nova University is now a member of District 7. In 1993, the Nova University women's volleyball team finishes 30–9, while winning the program's first Florida Sun Conference Championship and first NAIA Southeast Regional Championship. In 1996, NSU volleyball player Sherri Waddell is named Florida Sun Conference Player of the Year, as the Knights go 27–6 and make an NAIA South Regional Tournament appearance.

2000s
In 2002, NSU is granted full membership in the NCAA Division II and provisional membership in the Sunshine State Conference. In 2005, NSU unveils "Sharks" as the new nickname/mascot for the university and its athletic teams.

Rebuilding
In 2006, Volleyball hosts the NSU Sharks Classic, the first athletic event in the new 5,000-seat University Center Arena. On that same year, NSU Director of Athletics Michael Mominey names Steve Wilcosky as Interim Head Volleyball Coach and in November is promoted to head volleyball coach.

The 2006 season was supposed to be a rebuilding year for NSU, as the squad played in a new system under first year head coach Steve Wilcosky. However, after a 6–4 start and the program's first victory over a top 25 ranked opponent, it was apparent that the team possessed the passion and will to be a competitor in the Sunshine State Conference. 
After starting the season with three losses to top notch competition, the Sharks ran off five consecutive wins, including a four match sweep in the C.W. Post tournament in N.Y., N.Y. After splitting their next two matches, NSU dropped straight ten matches, eight of which were to teams that advanced to NCAA Division II post-season play. The Sharks rebounded to win four of their next five matches, including conference wins over Florida Tech and Rollins College. NSU finished the season by dropping five of their final six matches to finish 11–20 on the season and 3–13 in Sunshine State Conference play. 

Even with an 11–20 record, the Sharks earned respect in 2006 by playing 18 matches vs. teams that were invited to NCAA Division II post-season play. The team was 8–5 vs. all other opponents on the schedule. NSU played seven matches vs. teams ranked in the national top ten and showed their competitive spirit by playing the full five games in 12 matches during the season. The 11 wins were more than the NSU volleyball program combined to win in the previous two seasons. Included in those victories were the program's first upset of a top 25 team (9/1/06 vs. #25 Dowling College), and three victories over teams that earned post-season invites. 

The 2006 season was the final campaign for seniors Megan Johansen, Itza Miranda, and Karla Ortiz. 

Johansen played in all 120 games for NSU as a setter and broke the school record for set attempts in a season with 3366. She had 50 or more assists in 13 games and finished first on the team with a .292 attack percentage. Johansen ends her career as the single season record holder NCAA) in assists in a season with 1325 and career assists with 1657. 

Miranda played in all 31 matches and recorded a team high 539 digs, good for 4.42 per game. She also led the team with 33 service aces and had eleven games with 20 or more digs. Itza set a school record (NCAA) with 35 digs vs. Minnesota State on 8/25/06 and stands second in team history (NCAA) with 326 games and 92 matches played. She holds seven school records (NCAA), including digs in a career (1230), digs per game average (3.72) and digs in a single season (539). 

Ortiz started all 31 matches and played in all 125 games during her senior season. She was second on the team with 350 kills and finished third in attack percentage (.228), digs (298) total blocks (82) and points (413.5). Karla recorded double-figure kill totals in 21 matches and had a double-double in 14 matches. Ortiz finished her career with 13 NSU records (NCAA), including games played (437), matches played (122), kills (1091), attacks (3053), and total blocks (221).

New Era
For the first time in four years, the Sharks' have a coach returning to the bench, a familiar system, and a foundation to build on. Under Wilcosky, the focus is more on the principles of the game than on skill.

Junior setter Valia Petrova takes over the reins after transferring from Lees-McCrae College and sitting out last season. Petrova's past is filled with many accolades, including being named the Carolina's-Virginia Athletic Conference (CVAC) Freshman of the Year, First Team All-CVAC and First Team All-CVAC Tournament . Also looking to see time as a setter in a reserve role is senior Jenny Fitch, who posted 531 assists in 2005 for NSU and Division I University of Alabama-Birmingham (UAB) transfer, sophomore Aley Tallman. 

Junior co-captain Christina Chubb will anchor the outside hitter position, but will be challenged everyday by junior Andrea Irarrazabal, sophomore Jenerra McGruder and freshman Paola Ruiz. Chubb finished first on the team in kills per game and points per game a season ago and brings 193 collegiate matches of experience on the court with her. Irarrazabal is coming off a sophomore campaign in which she set career highs in kills, assists, aces and digs in a single game. McGruder provided valuable time on the court, starting 14 matches and playing in 75 games as a true freshman. The group also adds, Paola Ruiz, a high caliber athlete from St. Thomas High School.

Junior co-captain Emily Carle and fellow junior Melinda Gorman will hold down the middle for the Sharks. Carle finished first on the team in total blocks and was second with a .275 attack percentage a year ago. Gorman placed second on the team with 351 digs and 88 total blocks in a versatile role last season.

Junior Andrea Irarrazabal and sophomore transfer Aley Tallman each look to receive playing time on the right side. Irarrazabal, who will also challenge for time on the outside, will find a way to contribute onto the court this season. Tallman brings a year of Division I experience from University of Alabama-Birmingham (UAB), a team that advanced to the national tournament a year ago.

Senior Jenny Fitch, sophomore Alison Kalish and freshman Kathleen Yony will seek to receive the majority of playing time at libero this season. Fitch, who received a medical red-shirt a year ago, also has playing experience setting for the Sharks. Kalish started 11 matches and played in 80 games in her first year as a Shark a year ago. Yony, a freshman from Westminster Christian High in Miami, earned All-Dade County Volleyball honors and was selected to the Miami Herald 4A-1A Volleyball first team last year.

Season by season records

Volleyball